Launched in 2013, the Emirates Novel Award is awarded to Emirati writers.

The winner of the Awards receives AED 60,000 (about US$16,000), the second place AED 40,000, and AED 20,000 for the third place. All winning novels are available in main bookstores across the UAE, and e-books are available.

References

External links

Emirati literary awards
Fiction awards
Awards established in 2014